The Catholic Church in Niger is part of the worldwide Catholic Church, under the spiritual leadership of the Pope in Rome.

There are around 16,000 Catholics in Niger, which is divided into two dioceses: the Diocese of Maradi (approximately 1,000) and the much larger Diocese of Niamey (approximately 15,000).
The bishops are members of the Conference of Bishops of Burkina Faso and of Niger. Séraphin François Rouamba is the President of the Episcopal Conference and also is Archbishop of Koupela (Burkina Faso). Furthermore, Niger is member of the Regional Episcopal Conference of Francophone West Africa and Symposium of Episcopal Conferences of Africa and Madagascar.
Archbishop Vito Rallo is the Apostolic Nuncio of Niger, who is also nuncio to Burkina Faso.

Representatives of the Holy See

References

External links
 http://www.gcatholic.org/dioceses/country/NE.htm 
 http://www.catholic-hierarchy.org/country/ne.html 

 
Niger
Niger